WKML (95.7 FM) is a radio station broadcasting a country music format. Licensed to Lumberton, North Carolina, United States, it serves the Fayetteville area.  The station is currently owned by Beasley Media Group, LLC., through licensee Beasley Media Group Licenses, LLC.    Its studios are located east of downtown Fayetteville, and its transmitter is located west of St. Pauls, North Carolina.

History
This station was once WGSS, a beautiful music station located in Lumberton.

References

External links
official website

KML
KML